is the fifth single of the Japanese boy band Arashi. The single was released in two editions. While both the regular edition and limited edition contains two songs and its instrumentals, only the limited edition included stickers and changeable disc covers. It was certified gold by the RIAJ for a shipment of 200,000 copies.

Track listing

Charts

References

External links
 Kimi no Tame ni Boku ga Iru product information 
 Kimi no Tame ni Boku ga Iru Oricon profile 

Arashi songs
2001 singles
Pony Canyon singles
2001 songs
Songs written by Kōji Makaino